Holy Trinity Church is a Church of England parish church in Bincombe, Dorset, England. The church has late 12th-century origins, with later additions and a restoration of 1865. It is a Grade I listed building.

History

Much of the existing church dates to the 15th century, with parts of the nave and chancel dating to the late 12th century. The south wall of the chancel, north wall of the nave and the tower were all rebuilt in the 15th century, and the south wall of the nave heightened. A south porch was added in the 17th century using fragments of old stonework.

The church underwent extensive restoration and reseating in 1865. The cost of restoration was covered by voluntary subscription and Gonville and Caius College, the latter being the parish's principal landowner since 1570. The work was carried out by Mr. R. Reynolds of Weymouth, with Mr. S. Pitman as clerk of the works. The masonry work was carried out by Mr. George Roper of Bincombe. While the church was closed, a nearby barn was used as a temporary place of worship.

The interior was restored, the eastern wall of the chancel rebuilt and the external walls strengthened and underpinned. The church's pews were removed and replaced with new seating of stained deal. Some new fittings were also added, including a communion table, pulpit, reading desk and harmonium. The church was reopened by the Bishop of Salisbury, the Right Rev. Walter Kerr Hamilton, on 31 July 1865. The reopening was brought forward to coincide with the Bishop's visit to Dorchester for an archaeological meeting.

The church's organ was installed in 1901 after being transferred from St Nicholas' Church in Broadwey. A clock was installed on the tower as a thanksgiving at the end of World War II. In 1995, the church's roof was renewed and other repairs carried out at a cost of £82,000.

Architecture
Holy Trinity is built of rubblestone with freestone dressings, and slate and stone tiles on the roofs. The two-stage tower has a parapet and contains two bells, one by John Wallis of Salisbury, dated 1594, and another by Thomas Purdue, dated 1658. Internal fittings include a font of 13th-century origin, the bowl of which is made from Purbeck stone. The window in the east wall of the chancel contains stained glass added in 1865 in memory of surgeon John Howship's wife Elizabeth.

References

External links
 
 West Ridgeway Churches website

Churches in Dorset
Church of England church buildings in Dorset
Grade I listed churches in Dorset